Isaac Fisher (January 18, 1877 – August 23, 1957) was an American educator who graduated from Tuskegee Institute, served as principal at Branch Normal College, and taught at several other Historically Black Colleges and Universities. A protege of Booker T. Washington, he advocated vocational education.

Life
Fisher was born in East Carroll Parish, Louisiana, on a plantation called Perry's Place. He was born to former slaves, and was the youngest of their sixteen children. Fisher graduated from the Tuskegee Institute in 1898, and was valedictorian of his class. He succeeded Joseph Carter Corbin as principal of Branch Normal College, from 1902 to 1911. During his tenure, the school concentrated on  elementary and secondary education of students. He taught at Fisk University and Hampton Institute.

He believed, as did his mentor Booker T. Washington, in industrial education for African Americans.

His papers are held at the University of Arkansas.

Awards
1926 Guggenheim Fellowship

Works
"The Negro Problem as we are trying to solve it at Tuskeegee", Proceedings of the Pennsylvania Yearly Meeting of Progressive Friends, The Pennsylvania Yearly Meeting of Progressive Friends, 1891
Proceedings of the Annual Conference of the Presidents of Negro Land-Grant Colleges, 1933
A College President's Story

References

External links
 Fisher's biography at the Guggenheim Foundation
 Essay about Fisher by Mary E. Kiffer on the Guggenheim Foundation website

1877 births
1957 deaths
Tuskegee University alumni
University of Arkansas at Pine Bluff faculty
Fisk University faculty
Hampton University faculty